Makresh is a village in northwestern Bulgaria, part of Vidin Province. It is the administrative centre of the homonymous Makresh Municipality, which lies in the western part of Vidin Province, close to the Bulgarian-Serbian border. Makresh is situated 35 kilometres from the provincial capital Vidin, in the westernmost Danubian Plain, with the western reaches of the Balkan Mountains to its west.

Municipality

Makresh municipality has an area of 229 square kilometres includes the following 7 places:

Makresh municipality is mainly agricultural, growing wheat, barley, corn and rye. Sights in the area include the Rabisha Lake and the Rakovitsa Monastery dating to the 10th-11th century with the Holy Trinity Church.

Honour
Makresh Rocks off Robert Island, South Shetland Islands are named after Makresh.

External links
 Makresh municipality page at the Vidin Province website 

Villages in Vidin Province